The Embassy of the United Kingdom in Bratislava is the chief diplomatic mission of the United Kingdom in Slovakia. The Embassy is located on Panská street in the Staré Mesto area of the city. The current British Ambassador to Slovakia is Nigel Baker.

History
Slovakia became an independent state on 1 January 1993 after the peaceful dissolution of Czechoslovakia. From then until 1994 David Brighty, who had been British ambassador to Czechoslovakia, continued as both ambassador to the new Czech Republic and also non-resident ambassador to Slovakia. In 1994 David Brighty was replaced and Michael Bates, who had been chargé d'affaires in Bratislava, became the first resident Ambassador to Slovakia.

See also
Slovakia–United Kingdom relations
List of diplomatic missions in Slovakia
List of Ambassadors of the United Kingdom to Slovakia

References

External links
UAE Embassy Attestation in London

Bratislava
United Kingdom
Buildings and structures in Bratislava
Slovakia–United Kingdom relations